Peninsula Players is a summer theater located in Fish Creek, Wisconsin. Founded in 1935 by Richard and Caroline Fisher, it is known as "America's Oldest Professional Resident Summer Theatre."

History 
The Players was founded in 1935 by the brother and sister team of Caroline and Richard Fisher in a garden behind the Bonnie Brook motel in Fish Creek, Wisconsin. In 1937 the Fishers moved the newly founded theater to the recently vacated  Wildwood Boys Camp, along the shores of Green Bay between the towns of Egg Harbor and Fish Creek. There they built a barn-like proscenium stage house for an audience sitting under the stars. This is the present site of the theater.

The original Peninsula Players stage was built with the help of Samuel Wanamaker, an American film director and actor who is credited as the person most responsible for the modern recreation of Shakespeare's Globe Theatre in London.

In 1946 a canvas tent was erected over the audience to provide some shelter from inclement weather, and in 1957 a new audience pavilion with open sides was built as a permanent structure. In 1960, the Fishers sold the theater at public auction, where it was purchased by Kenneth Carroad, a lawyer from New York City.  

Carroad asked long-time “Player”, James B. McKenzie, to oversee business operations as producer. McKenzie accepted and in 1962 assisted in forming the Peninsula Players Theatre Foundation, Inc., a non-profit organization created to operate the theater. In 1978 Carroad sold the property to the McKenzies, who maintained ownership until 1993, when the Peninsula Players Theatre Foundation purchased the property.

Todd Schmidt organized more improvements for the Players, such as a new theatre and stage house, improved actor housing, new public restroom facilities, expanded and upgraded rehearsal and storage areas, a computerized box office, and new gardens.

Executive Producers
Caroline and Richard Fisher - 1935-1953
Caroline Fisher and Rodion Rathbone - 1953-1962
James B. McKenzie - 1962-2001 
Todd Schmidt - 2000-2007

Artistic Directors and Resident Directors
Caroline and Richard Fisher (Artistic Directors) 1935-1960
Richard Fisher (Resident Director)
Leo Lucker (Resident Director) 1955
Jeanne Bolan (Resident Director) 1957-1976
Bob Thompson (Resident Director/Artistic Director) 1953-57 and 1976-91
Greg Vinkler (Resident Director/Artistic Director) 1997-2021
Linda Fortunato (Resident Director/Artistic Director) 2021-

General Managers and Managing Directors
Caroline and Richard Fisher (General Managers) 1935-1953 
Caroline Fisher and Rodion Rathbone (General Managers) 1953-1962
Tom Birmingham (General Manager) 1960-1984
John Walker (General Manager) 1984-
Todd Schmidt (General Manager)
Brian Kelsey - (Managing Director) 2008-

Guest directors
William Ball
Maurice Gnesin 
Amy McKenzie
Tom Mula
Todd Schmidt
Nancy Simon

New stage house
In the fall of 2005 the Players ended their season early and demolition and construction began on a new stage house. The new stage house, which opened in the summer of 2006, has a full fly tower, a grass roof, cushioned seats, and solid walls that can be raised and lowered based on weather conditions. The new theater also has a radiant heated floor that allows performances well into October.

Direct from Broadway 

The Peninsula Players were known for getting the rights to Neil Simon plays not long after they opened on Broadway. Through executive producer Jim McKenzie’s association with Emanuel "Manny" Azenberg, Simon’s Broadway producer, he was able to negotiate the Midwest premières of a majority of Simon’s plays from 1963 through 1986.

Simon's “Biloxi Blues” made its Players debut on July 29, 1986, months after closing on Broadway. McKenzie gave Nancy Simon, Neil’s daughter, her first opportunity to direct when he produced the Peninsula Players production in 1986. In 1987, Biloxi Blues was re-staged by Nancy Simon at the Westport Country Playhouse in Connecticut where McKenzie also served as executive producer.

Fall season 
In 1981, actors John Walker, Pamela Gaye, Amy McKenzie, and a small troupe of artisans from the Players created the first Fall season. The play Children of a Lesser God, with Walker and Gaye in the principal roles was presented. James McKenzie remained executive producer until his death in 2001. The fall season continued with an additional play that opened after the end of the traditional summer theatre season.

Comedy Cabaret 

In 1983, while in New York City, executive producer Jim McKenzie contracted Amy McKenzie and Richard O'Donnell to create an after-show revue to complement evening performances at the Players. The Comedy Cabaret, produced by Amy McKenzie and written by O'Donnell, opened the summer of 1984. The Comedy Cabaret eventually opened in Chicago as New Age Vaudeville whereby they "won over critics and audiences."

The Play's the Thing 
In February 2010, Artistic Director Greg Vinkler established a winter play reading series The Play's the Thing, produced in coordination with Door County Reads. It is performed at Björklunden, the northern campus of Lawrence University in Baileys Harbor.

Actor's Equity Association
Actors at Peninsula Players are members of Actors' Equity, the union of professional actors and stage managers.

Awards
Peninsula Players received the 2014 Governor's Award for Arts, Culture and Heritage.

Notable alumni
René Auberjonois
Megan Cavanagh
Kip Cohen
Pamela Gaye Walker
Stacy Keach, Sr.
Harvey Korman
James B. McKenzie
Amy McKenzie
Jessie Mueller 
Richard O'Donnell
Bob Thompson
Ralph Waite
John Walker

References

External links
Official website

Theatre companies in Wisconsin
Theatre